73rd parallel may refer to:

73rd parallel north, a circle of latitude in the Northern Hemisphere
73rd parallel south, a circle of latitude in the Southern Hemisphere